Matthew Joseph Newton (born January 22, 1977) is an Australian actor, writer, and director, and son of TV personalities Bert and Patti Newton.

Career

Acting
Newton has performed in Australia and abroad on stage, television and movies. In 1988, he starred in Sugar and Spice, a children's television series. In 1992, he starred in Late For School, a drama series that aired briefly on Channel Ten. In 1993 he made his motion picture debut, appearing in the Australian independent satirical science fiction body horror movie Body Melt. In 2000, he starred alongside Pia Miranda in the film adaptation of the teen novel Looking for Alibrandi. In 2001 he appeared in the Australian/American science fiction show Farscape as the character Jothee, and as the vampire Armand in Queen of the Damned (in 2002). His acting career was interrupted by treatment in a psychiatric unit for bipolar disorder after several incidents of domestic violence and assault, which were widely reported in the Australian media. 

2002–2008
In 2005, Newton starred in The Surgeon, which aired on Channel Ten.

In 2006, he appeared in the first and second seasons of improvisation comedy show Thank God You're Here. Newton also starred in a TV series for TV1 called Stupid, Stupid Man set in the office of a fictional men's magazine called COQ where he plays Nick Driscoll, the features writer.

In 2008, he was reportedly close to being cast for a role as a gangster in the first season of Underbelly, but did not get the role. He went on to appear in Underbelly: A Tale of Two Cities as protagonist Terry Clark.

Newton wrote, directed and starred in the feature Three Blind Mice, which made its international premiere at the Toronto International Film Festival and won the Critics Prize at the 2008 London Film Festival.

2010
In 2010, Newton was announced as the host of the Australian version of The X Factor on the Seven Network. However, in August 2010 following two domestic violence incidents involving girlfriend Rachael Taylor at a hotel in Rome, Newton had to quit The X Factor due to 'medical advice'.

2011
In 2011, Newton appeared in Face to Face, an independent Australian film directed by Michael Rymer. Newton also appeared in The Lie (directed by Joshua Leonard) in 2011.

2013–present
In November 2013, Newton directed and starred in an off-Broadway production of Hamlet in New York City.

Music
Newton performed "The Christmas Song" at the Carols by Candlelight Christmas Eve family event at the Sidney Myer Music Bowl in 2009.

Radio
On 15 January 2007, Newton was fired from his new role at Nova. He had recently been signed to co-host The Matt and Boothy Show with comedian Akmal Saleh in the prime time drive shift on Fridays. The Daily Telegraph confirmed that Newton announced the radio station had released him from his contract, reportedly worth up to $200,000 a year.

The station suspended his involvement in the broadcasts, which were due to begin on 15 January, after allegations were made public that he had assaulted actress Brooke Satchwell, his then-girlfriend. Television actress Kate Ritchie replaced him at Nova.

2006 events
In 2006, Newton appeared on the New Year's Eve 2006 episode of The Big Night In with John Foreman on Network Ten in which he engaged in simulated sex acts and other suggestive activity. The Daily Telegraph reported his antics and the station received criticism from outraged viewers who complained the show was "sub-standard coverage" and "the worst ever".

In 2006, Newton split with Brooke Satchwell. Newton was arrested on 16 October and charged with intimidation and assault occasioning actual bodily harm over incidents alleged to have occurred on 13 September and 6 October. He denied the charges.

Newton was originally charged with four offences, but on 21 May 2007 a court heard he would plead guilty to one count of common assault – with police agreeing to drop counts of assault occasioning actual bodily harm and stalking and intimidating Satchwell, intending to cause her to fear physical or mental harm. On 12 June, Newton appeared in court and pleaded guilty to the one count of common assault and was put on a 12-month good behaviour bond.
Magistrate Paul Cloran, who recorded the conviction against Newton, acknowledged that although the actor received some character references from friends and family he felt compelled to record a conviction.

In July 2007, Newton had his conviction overturned based on medical grounds. Solicitor Chris Murphy tendered a letter from Dr Robert Hampshire, Newton's psychiatrist, which outlined his depressive illness and stated he was unlikely to reoffend. Judge Joseph Moore said, "It does not in any way lead the court to give special consideration to his case because he is a person of high profile", referring to Newton's celebrity status; and, "The way in which he has been given particular media attention has acted as a considerable measure of punishment."

2009 events
In November 2009, Newton's hotel room in Kings Cross, Sydney, was trashed after the GQ Men's Award Night. According to media reports, the damage to the room was over $9,000. The room was booked in the name of his then girlfriend Rachael Taylor and he departed the next day without checking out. New South Wales Police investigated the matter but no charges were laid.

2010 events
In August 2010, following two domestic violence incidents involving girlfriend Rachael Taylor at a hotel in Rome, where Newton allegedly "punched Taylor in the face before being sedated by ambulance officers," it was reported that Taylor suffered concussion after she hit her head on the hotel's marble floor, and a sprained jaw after the alleged attack. Taylor took out an Apprehended Violence Order (AVO) against Newton. The media also reported his heavy use of alcohol, cocaine, marijuana, and methamphetamine at this time.

2011 events
In February 2011, Newton was charged with breaching the terms of his AVO. He was released on bail and ordered to appear in court in March 2011.

It is alleged that Newton assaulted a 66-year-old taxi driver twice in the Sydney suburb of Crows Nest on 4 December 2011. He was charged with common assault and appeared in court in January 2012. The matter was originally stood over to April 2012. The matter was then stood over for a further three months as Newton was facing separate charges in the United States (see below).

2012 events
In April 2012, Newton was arrested twice in Miami, Florida. In the first incident, on 7 April, he was charged with trespassing and resisting officers. In a second incident on 17 April, Newton was charged with battery and resisting arrest after he attacked a hotel receptionist. His lawyer tweeted that people with bipolar disorder need patience and support, and said that Newton is continuing treatment.

On 14 November 2012, both matters were dismissed, conditional upon Newton completing 50 hours of community service, writing a letter of apology to the hotel clerk, Ariel Bory Vargas, paying $US11,500 restitution to Vargas and staying away from both him and Mr. Moe's, the bar where he was accused of trespass.

2018 concerns and criticism 
In August 2018, Jessica Chastain was criticised for choosing to work with Newton on the film, Ava. Chastain is a co-producer and Newton was selected as writer and director. Critics noted that appointing Newton for the role contrasted with Chastain's participation in the Time's Up campaign. Newton later stepped down as director.

Filmography

Films

Television

References

External links

TV.com: Matthew Newton. Retrieved 15 January 2006

1977 births
Australian male film actors
Australian male stage actors
Australian television personalities
Male actors from Melbourne
Criminals from Melbourne
People educated at Xavier College
People with bipolar disorder
Living people
Australian expatriate male actors in the United States